Cuba Street is a prominent city street in Wellington, New Zealand. Among the best known and most popular streets in the city, the Cuba precinct has been labelled Wellington's cultural centre, and is known for its high-per-capita arts scene the world over.

Cuba Street and the surrounding area (known as the Cuba Street Precinct), known for its bohemian nature, boasts scores of cafés, op-shops, music venues, restaurants, record shops, bookshops, heritage architecture of various styles, and a general "quirkiness" that has made it one of the city's most popular tourist destinations. A youth-driven location, the partly pedestrianised Cuba Street is full of shoppers and city-dwellers all year round.

Developed at the point of colonisation on Te Ati Awa land, Cuba Street runs south from the CBD of Wellington in the inner city, and was originally full of very basic homes built into the forest, such as "the Old Shebang". Contrary to colloquial assumption that the street is named after Cuba, it is actually named after an early New Zealand Company settler ship, the Cuba, which arrived in Wellington Harbour on 3 January 1840. Many coffeeshops and restaurants take this misinterpretation in their stride, having names and colours that reference the island nation of Cuba. The street's historic buildings, spanning Edwardian, Art Deco, and various weatherboard styles, were completed from the 19th-20th centuries. From the 1970s to early 80s, the street became the red light district of Wellington, and a sign of solidarity against New Zealand's laws making homosexual acts illegal until 1986. The street's rainbow crossing and icons of local drag queen and activist Carmen Rupe commemorate this.

The section between Dixon Street and Ghuznee Street is a pedestrian mall, with streets filled with a wide array of independent shops further up. The area is divided into distinct parts; Lower, Central and Upper Cuba, which have different architecture and are fairly distinct, as well as Lower Cuba being more pedestrianised. Part of the large inner city suburb of Te Aro, Cuba Street has become increasingly the home of Wellington's culture since the 1960s, and has been called the city's "creative heart".

History and location
Cuba Street runs south from the CBD of Wellington in the inner city. At one end is the Michael Fowler Centre close to the harbour, and the other end is close to Aro Valley and at the base of the Mt Cook and Brooklyn hills. The street was named by Captain William Mein Smith the first Surveyor General after an early New Zealand Company settler ship, the Cuba, which he arrived in Wellington Harbour on 3 January 1840. Cuba Street runs across land that was once next to Te Aro Pā and the gardens of Māori iwi who lived there.

One of the first colonial families that purchased land around upper Cuba Street were the Tonks in the 1840s. They established brickyards, and streets in the area were named after them including Tonks Ave, Arthur Street, and Frederick Street. Cuba Street was a major thoroughfare in this time. It was sealed in the late 1800s and got gas street lamps in the 1860s. The historic area of upper Cuba Street near Tonks Ave and Arthur Street was majorly re-formed due to a controversial inner city bypass road that was completed in 2007.

For 60 years (1904–1964) an electric tram line went up Cuba Street as part of the Wellington tramway system. After the tramlines were removed and following public pressure the middle section of the street closed to traffic in 1969 to become a pedestrian mall and has remained so.

Since 1995 Cuba Street has been a registered Historic Area under the Historic Places Act 1993, with over 40 buildings of historic significance including the Bank of New Zealand building and National Bank Building. Despite the number of older buildings in the street, there was little building damage from the 2016 Kaikoura earthquake.

Cuba Street is the centre of one of the four 'quarters' of downtown Wellington, the Cuba Quarter, the other quarters are centred on Lambton Quay, Courtenay Place and Willis Street.

Literary history 
Mary Taylor (1817–1893), lifelong friend and correspondent of author Charlotte Brontë, owned and ran a small Cuba Street general store, from circa 1840 to 1860. The shop no longer exists but a heritage storyboard at the intersection of Cuba and Dixon streets commemorates her.

Local people and activities
Cuba Street is described as the bohemian creative area of Wellington, and is the home to many cafes, op-shops, boutique fashion stores, art galleries, and music shops.

On Cuba Street is the Enjoy Gallery, {Suite} Gallery, McLeavey Gallery, and Thistle Hall. In 2005, the new Wellington Arts Centre was established in Abel Smith Street, a half block from upper Cuba Street. Also nearby are Victoria University of Wellington Faculty of Architecture and Design, Access Radio, Radio Active, Glover Park. Glover Park was a regular hangout of rough sleepers and a council Public Places Bylaw that was reviewed in 2004 meant they were getting evicted which essentially moved them into Cuba Mall.

The Bucket Fountain is a prominent sculpture in Cuba Mall.

In 2018 some retailers moved into the adjacent Ghuznee Street.

The northern end is more commercial, with established chain stores such as Whitcoulls and The Body Shop. The southern end (known as the 'top' of Cuba Street, or upper Cuba) is more boutique.

In the mid-1970s to early 1980s, Vivian Street which crosses Cuba St was Wellington's red light district, with street prostitutes, strip clubs, peep shows and gay bars.  New Zealand's first iconic drag queen and activist Carmen Rupe ran Carmen's International Coffee Lounge on Vivian Street in the 60s and 70s. Pedestrian light signals in her likeness were put up at four intersections along Cuba Street in 2016 to coincide with the 30-year anniversary of the Homosexual Law Reform Bill coming into effect.

Music and venues
Cuba Dupa is an annual street party celebrating Cuba Street.

Fat Freddy's Drop's first album, Live at the Matterhorn was recorded at the Matterhorn bar on Cuba Street. Other venues in the area include Hotel Bristol, San Francisco Bathhouse, J.J. Murphy's, Southern Cross, S&M Bar, Midnight Espresso, Olive, K Bar, Hope Brothers, Havana Bar, Good Luck, The Duke, and Logan Brown. The lower end of Cuba Street ends at Wellington Town Hall, Civic Square, Michael Fowler Centre, and Wakefield Street.

Gallery

References

External links

Cuba Street Online

Streets in Wellington City
Pedestrian malls in New Zealand
Shopping districts and streets in New Zealand
Red-light districts in New Zealand